Maurizio Bassi (born 1960) is an Italian music composer and musician. He is best known as the singer of Baltimora along with Naimy Hackett and Jimmy McShane. He is also the father of Emiliano and Matteo Bassi.

Career
Not much is documented about Bassi other than he had released two solo singles/EPs in both 1974 (Mau Bassi* / Vittorio Inzaina - Perchè Solo Noi / Welcome To Costa Smeralda (7")) and 1981 (Arrivederci / Di Tutto Un Pop). He gained worldwide recognition with his Italian-based project, Baltimora. He formed it with both Naimy Hackett and Jimmy McShane.

Notable singles by the band include: "Tarzan Boy", "Woody Boogie", "Living in the Background" and "Key Key Karimba" The most successful of the singles was "Tarzan Boy". The band split in 1987; however in 1993, Bassi re-recorded and released "Tarzan Boy" as a remix. This remix bounced back into the Billboard Hot 100 chart in March 1993, climbing to No. 51, at the time of its appearance in a Listerine commercial. The song was also featured in the films Teenage Mutant Ninja Turtles III (1993), Beverly Hills Ninja (1997) and was then referenced in A Million Ways to Die in the West (2014).

Bassi is said to have been the actual singer of the band but chose McShane to lip sync all the lyrics in the videos.

Recent times
McShane passed away from AIDS-related illness in 1995 and Bassi has made no singles or contributions since. However, his sons are both active in the music industry.

References

External links
 Maurizio Bassi on SecondHand Songs
 Maurizio Bassi on IMDB

Living people
Italian composers
1960 births